Sinister Minister is a thoroughbred race horse.  As a foal born on March 29, 2003, he was a possible contender for the Triple Crown in 2006.

Connections

Sinister Minister is owned by the Lanni Family Trust and trained by Bob Baffert.  He's often been ridden by Victor Espinoza.

Sinister Minister was bred in Kentucky by Mr & Mrs. Michael L. Owens.  By Old Trieste, his dam is Sweet Minister by The Prime Minister.

Stud career
Sinister Minister was retired to stud in 2008 and stands at the Arrow Stud in Japan.

Notable progeny

c = colt, f = filly, g = gelding

Races

References

 NTRA bio
 Sinister Minister's pedigree

2003 racehorse births
Racehorses bred in Kentucky
Racehorses trained in the United States
Thoroughbred family 4-m